Pringle Richards Sharratt is an architectural firm that was formed in 1996 by John Pringle, Penny Richards and Ian Sharratt.  Based in London, the practice has worked on public buildings, art galleries, museums, libraries, archives, university and transport buildings. Before forming PRS, John Pringle and Ian Sharratt were partners at Michael Hopkins and Partners and Penny Richards had her own practice that specialised in museum and gallery projects.

Notable projects 
Winter Garden & Millennium Galleries, Sheffield (2002)
Gallery Oldham, Oldham (2002)
Oldham Library & Lifelong Learning Centre (2005)
Herbert Art Gallery & Museum, Coventry (2008) 
Shrewsbury School Music School (2001)
Pitt Rivers Museum Research Centre and Balfour Library, Oxford University (2006)
Radcliffe Science Library, Oxford University (2007)
Victoria and Albert Museum Grand Entrance, Glass Gallery, Contemporary Glass Gallery, Textile Reference Collection, Temporary Exhibition Galleries (1996–2006)
Real Tennis Court, Middlesex University (1999)
Carlisle Lane Flats (2005)
Hull History Centre
West Ham Bus Garage for Transport for London (2009)
Fit out of the Palestra Building and installation of UK's largest internal Fuel Cell [(Transport For London)] (2006–10)
Black Cultural Archives, Brixton, London (2014)

Awards 
2001
RIBA (Royal Institute of British Architects) Award, Shrewsbury School Music School & Auditorium
British Construction Industry Awards (Shortlisting), Shrewsbury School Music School & Auditorium and Millennium Galleries, Sheffield
Wood Award (Shortlisting), Shrewsbury School Music School & Auditorium
Shrewsbury & Atcham Design & Heritage Award, Shrewsbury School Music School & Auditorium

2002
Civic Trust Award, Sheffield Millennium Galleries
RIBA (Royal Institute of British Architects) Award, Gallery Oldham
Concrete Society Award, Sheffield Millennium Galleries
Kensington & Chelsea Environment Award Scheme, Victoria & Albert Museum
Brick Award Commendation, Shrewsbury School Music School & Auditorium
Manchester Civic Society Design Award, Gallery Oldham

2003
RIBA (Royal Institute of British Architects) Award, Sheffield Millennium Galleries & Winter Garden
Royal Fine Art Commission Trust Building of the Year Jeu d'Esprit Award, Sheffield Winter Garden
Civic Trust Award Commendation, Shrewsbury School Music School & Auditorium
RICS (Royal Institution of Chartered Surveyors) Pro Yorkshire Award for Design & Innovation, Sheffield Winter Garden
British Guild of Travel Writers' Commendation, Winter Garden
Civic Trust Green Flag Award, Sheffield Winter Garden
Variety Club of Great Britain Best Regeneration Award, Winter Garden
Wood Award Shortlisting, Sheffield Winter Garden
ICE (Institution of Civil Engineers) Yorkshire Award, Highly Commended, Sheffield Winter Garden

2004
Civic Trust Awards, Gallery Oldham & Sheffield Winter Garden
ECSN European Award for Excellence in Concrete, Sheffield Millennium Galleries
European Federation of Interior Landscaping Groups Gold Award, Winter Garden

2005
Wood Award Commendation, Carlisle Lane Flats

2007
Prime Minister's Better Public Building Award (Shortlisting), Oldham Library & Lifelong Learning Centre
Academy of Urbanism, The Great Place Award, Winter Garden
British Construction Industry Awards (Shortlisting), Oldham Library & Lifelong Learning Centre
Landscape Institute Awards - President's Award, Sheffield Winter Garden

Notes

Architecture firms based in London